Vojnatina is a village and municipality in the Sobrance District in the Košice Region of east Slovakia.

History
In historical records the village was first mentioned in 1336.

Geography
The village lies at an altitude of 136 metres and covers an area of 7.688 km².
It has a population of 240 people.

Facilities
The village has a public library a gymnasium and a soccer pitch.

References

External links
 
http://en.e-obce.sk/obec/vojnatina/vojnatina.html
http://www.statistics.sk/mosmis/eng/run.html

Villages and municipalities in Sobrance District